David Anthony Reiss (born May 1943) is the founder of the British global fashion chain Reiss.

According to The Sunday Times Rich List in 2019, Reiss is worth £240 million.

Early life
David Anthony Reiss was born to a Jewish family in May 1943. His father, Joshua Reiss, operated a store in Bishopsgate that was founded by his uncle, Samuel Reiss (born 1903) who was an immigrant from a south-eastern Polish shtetl in Radomyśl Wielki. His family were members of the orthodox Raleigh Close (Hendon United Synagogue).

Career
David took over his father's gentlemen's outfitters on the corner of Bishopsgate and Petticoat Lane in the City of London, in 1971, when he was in his 20s.

Today Reiss is the last big owner-founder entrepreneur left in British retail. Reiss has a target to open 260 stores around the world, including 100 franchise stores (the company has already signed a deal for 40 in Europe, the Far East and the Middle East), and 50 stand-alone stores in Europe and the United States. The debut in New York City proved a success, recouping the money Reiss invested in just one year, which made Reiss continue pursuing his international plans and in 2007 the retailer boasted eight more US stores,  including stores in Boston, San Francisco, Washington, D.C., and Los Angeles. Additional stores opened in Short Hills, New Jersey and Boca Raton, Florida.

In April 2016, a majority stake was sold to the American private equity firm Warburg Pincus for £230 million.

Personal life
Reiss is married to Rosemary Reiss; they have three children: Ali, Debbie and Darren, and lives in Hampstead, London. Reiss's son is a director at HSBC, and his daughter Debra worked for the chain in Los Angeles until her death from a long-term illness in 2015. David's eldest daughter Ali was involved in the business for many years before leaving in her 30s to concentrate on her children.

His "only extravagance" is a Bentley.

References

English Jews
1943 births
Living people
British company founders